Denfert-Rochereau is a station on the Paris Métro in France. An adjacent station with the same name is served by RER B.

Location
The station is located under Place Denfert-Rochereau, the platforms being:
 Line 4 – curved and approximately north-south, along the axis of Avenue du Général-Leclerc (between Raspail and Mouton-Duvernet stations);
 Line 6 – also on a curve partly under Line 4 and oriented northwest–southeast, along the axis of Boulevard Raspail on the one hand and Boulevard Saint-Jacques on the other (between Raspail and Saint-Jacques, preceding an overhead section towards Nation).

Name
The name of the station refers to Place Denfert-Rochereau, named for the 19th‑century general Pierre Philippe Denfert-Rochereau, who led the resistance of Belfort to a siege during the Franco-Prussian War. The first part of the name is identical in pronunciation to its former name of Place d'Enfer ("Place of Hell"). It is the location of the Barrière d’Enfer, a gate built for the collection of taxation as part of the Wall of the Farmers-General; the gate was built between 1784 and 1788 and is one of only four of the 55 gates with any surviving remains.
The station is sub-titled Colonel Rol-Tanguy, after Henri Rol-Tanguy, a leader in the French Resistance during World War II.

History
The station opened on 24 April 1906 with the opening of the extension of line 2 Sud from Passy to Place d'Italie. On 14 October 1907 line 2 Sud became part of line 5. On 12 October 1942 the section of line 5 between Étoile and Place d'Italie, including Denfert-Rochereau, was transferred from line 5 to line 6 in order to separate the underground and elevated sections of the metro (because the latter were more vulnerable to air attack during World War II). The line 4 platforms were opened on 30 October 1909 when the southern section of line 4 was opened between Raspail and Porte d'Orléans.

Passenger services

Access
The station has three entrances divided into four subway points, all of which consist of fixed stairs:
 Entrance 1 Place Denfert-Rochereau – the Catacombs of Paris, adorned with a Guimard edicule, it was registered as a historic monument on 12 February 2016, leads to the right of No. 2 Avenue Colonel-Henri-Rol-Tanguy;
 Entrance 2 Rue Daguerre – consisting of two entrances established back-to-back on the even sidewalk of Avenue du Général-Leclerc, the most southerly, embellished with a mast with a yellow "M" in one circle is opposite No. 4 while the other is on the right of No. 2;
 Entrance 3 Avenue du Général-Leclerc – also with a yellow "M" totem, leading to building No. 1.
In addition, the station had in the past a fourth access, now condemned, to the right of No. 11 Place Denfert-Rochereau.

Station layout

Platforms
The platforms of the two lines, established on a curve, each with two platforms separated by the tracks of the metro and the roof is elliptic. The platforms of Line 6 are arranged in the Andreu-Motte style with two orange luminous railing, benches, tympanums and outlets of the flat brown tile corridors and Motte orange seats. It is therefore one of the few stations still presenting the Andreu-Motte style in its entirety. This arrangement is paired with the white beveled ceramic tiles, which cover the walls and the vault. The advertising frames are metallic and the name of the station is written in capital letters on enamelled plates. In 2017, the platforms of Line 4 were under construction.

Bus and other connections
The station is served by lines 38, 59, 64, 68, 88, 216, Orlybus and the OpenTour tourist line of the RATP Bus Network and, at night, by the N14, N21 and N122 lines of the Noctilien network.

The station is also connected to the RER B at the Denfert-Rochereau station. This station, opened in 1846, was initially the northern terminus of the Ligne de Sceaux.

Gallery

References

Paris Métro stations in the 14th arrondissement of Paris
Railway stations in France opened in 1906